The Baltic University in Exile was established in the displaced persons camps in Germany to educate refugees from Estonia, Latvia and Lithuania in the aftermath of the Second World War.

The University was established at Hamburg in the British Zone of Occupation in March 1946, with aid from UNRRA, the Lutheran World Federation, and other groups. In early 1947, it was moved to a former Luftwaffe barracks in Pinneberg (Eggerstedt-Kaserne) and renamed the Displaced Person's Study Centre. The University's presidents were Fricis Gulbis (1946–1948), Vladas Stanka (1948–1949) and Eduards Šturms (1949), assisted by three (Estonian, Latvian and Lithuanian) national rectors. The Estonian astronomer Ernst Öpik became its first Estonian rector, and  the Lithuanian archaeologist, Jonas Puzinas, was Lithuanian rector from April 1948 to September 1949. Because many of the staff and students had found homes in other countries, the University was closed in September 1949.

A total of 76 students graduated from the Baltic University in its short existence: 53 of them were Latvian, 16 Lithuanian, and 7 Estonian. Many others went on to complete their studies at other universities. Three male student fraternities, Fraternitas Imantica, Gersicania and Fraternitas Cursica, and two female, Spīdola and Zinta, were founded in Pinneberg. A non-notable Estonian corporation, Fraternitas Ucuensis, was founded in 1948.

In 1947 it was written that "The Baltic DP university with about 170 professors on the teaching staff and 1,200 students in eight faculties and 13 subdivisions has been running for three semester."

People associated with the university
Mykolas Biržiška
Viktoras Biržiška
Teodoras Daukantas
Aleksis Dreimanis
Pāvils Dreijmanis
Eižens Laube
Ernst Öpik
Jonas Puzinas
Lauri Vaska
Arthur Võõbus

References

Displaced persons camps in the aftermath of World War II
Forced migration
Aftermath of World War II
Baltic states
Educational institutions established in 1946
1946 establishments in Germany
Educational institutions disestablished in 1949
Universities in Germany
Universities and colleges in Hamburg
Universities and colleges in Schleswig-Holstein